The embedded computer systems onboard Mars rovers are designed to be robust against withstand high radiation levels and large temperature changes in space. For this reason their computational resources are more yet limited compared to systems commonly used on Earth.

In operation 
Direct teleoperation of a Mars rover is impractical, since the round trip communication time between Earth and Mars ranges from 8 to 42 minutes and the Deep Space Network system is only available a few times during each Martian day (sol). Therefore, a rover command team plans, then sends, a sol of operational commands to the rover at one time.

A rover uses autonomy software to make decisions based on observations from its sensors. Each pair of images for stereo the Sojourner rover could generate 20 navigation 3D points (with the initial software version the craft landed with). The MER rovers can generate 15,000 (nominal) to 40,000 (survey mode) 3D points.

Performance comparisons

With the exception of Curiosity and Perseverance, each Mars rover has only one on-board computer. Both Curiosity and Perseverance have two identical computers for redundancy. Curiosity is, as of February 2013, operating on its redundant computer, while its primary computer is being investigated for the reasons why it started to fail.

Mars Rovers

See also
Radiation hardening

References

External links 
 The CPUs of Spacecraft Computers in Space
 Radiation‑hardened electronics product guide - BAE Systems 

Space technology
Exploration of Mars
Computing comparisons